"You'll Never Never Know" is a single by the Platters released in 1956. The song reached number 11 on the Billboard Pop Singles chart. On the Most Played R&B in Jukeboxes chart, the song peaked at number 9. Outside the US, "You'll Never Never Know" went to number 23 on the UK Singles Chart.

References

1956 singles
The Platters songs
1956 songs